Heritage Xperiential Learning School is an independent, co-educational experiential learning school based in the Indian district of Gurgaon in the state of Haryana. The school is affiliated with the Central Board of Secondary Education (CBSE), the International General Certificate of Secondary Education (IGCSE) and the International Baccalaureate's Diploma Program (IBDP).

Raahgiri Days
The Raahgiri initiative was started in the school by sixth-grade pupils working on a project to make Gurgaon a more cycle-friendly city. In conjunction with regional civil society organizations, the idea later developed into a campaign for non-motorized days and became known as Raahgiri Day. The days are currently conducted in 11 Indian cities, and the movement is still growing.

The Muskan Project
The Heritage Xperiential Learning School has also been collaborating with the Haryana State Government to raise the standard of education in the state. Under the Muskan pilot project, it adopted a public elementary school where it exchanges teaching methods, creative concepts, and new ideas with the faculty.

Climate Change
Students began rallying for the cause of climate change, and on Friday, March 16, 2019, students from 1,787 sites across 112 different nations marched in protest. Nearly 400 students gathered in Delhi, chanting and waving placards. In addition, students from local schools gathered at Central Park in Connaught Place to engage in the global "Fridays for Future" climate change protest.

The protest was also held in Gurgaon. Students from Heritage Xperiential Learning School Gurgaon, who are also a part of the school's center for active citizenship to support the preservation of the Aravallis, were also present at the protest.

Annual Summits

Awards
NDTV Award nominee for top school in North India
Ashoka Changemaker School
Education world school ranking, 2019-20

References

External links

Co-educational schools in India
International Baccalaureate schools in India
Private schools in Haryana
Education in Gurgaon
Educational institutions established in 2003
2003 establishments in Haryana